Fabien Causeur (born 16 June 1987) is a French professional basketball player for Real Madrid of the Liga ACB and the EuroLeague. He was the 2018 French Player of the Year.

Professional career
Causeur played in the French League starting in 2005.  He spent the first four years of his career with STB Le Havre.  Le Havre finished fifth in the French League in the 2007–08 season; as a result Causeur played eight games with the team in the EuroCup 2008–09. Causeur joined the French team Cholet Basket for the 2009–10 season.  He saw action in five games for the team in the EuroCup 2009–10.

He then moved to the Liga ACB club Saski Baskonia, where he played from 2012 to 2016. On 3 August 2016 Causeur signed with Brose Bamberg of the German Basketball Bundesliga and the EuroLeague.

In the 2016–17 season, Causeur won the Basketball Bundesliga title with Bamberg after sweeping EWE Baskets Oldenburg 3–0 in the Finals. Causeur was named the BBL Finals MVP, after averaging 14.0 points and 5.3 rebounds in the series.

On July 25, 2017, Causeur signed a two-year deal with Real Madrid. In May 2018, Real Madrid won the 2017–18 EuroLeague championship, after defeating Fenerbahçe Doğuş in the final game with 85–80. Over 36 EuroLeague games, Causeur averaged 6.9 points, 1.9 assists and 1.6 rebounds per game. On July 3, 2019, Causeur agreed a contract extension with Real Madrid until 2022.

National team career
Causeur first played with the junior national teams of France at the 2007 FIBA Europe Under-20 Championship. He was selected to the senior men's French national basketball team for the first time for the 2010 FIBA World Championship. He also played at the 2012 Summer Olympics.

Career statistics

EuroLeague

|-
| style="text-align:left;"| 2010–11
| style="text-align:left;"| Cholet
| 4 || 3 || 29.3 || .379 || .267 || .643 || 3.5 || 2.3 || 1.0 || .0 || 8.8 || 8.3
|-
| style="text-align:left;"| 2012–13
| style="text-align:left;" rowspan=4| Baskonia
| 28 || 13 || 20.8 || .503 || .375 || .692 || 1.7 || 1.5 || .7 || .1 || 7.7 || 5.8
|-
| style="text-align:left;"| 2013–14
| 17 || 12 || 23.2 || .424 || .297 || 1.000 || 2.4 || 1.5 || .5 || .1 || 5.9 || 6.0
|-
| style="text-align:left;"| 2014–15
| 23 || 19 || 23.9 || .506 || .345 || .700 || 2.7 || 2.3 || 1.3 || .3 || 9.3 || 11.4
|-
| style="text-align:left;"| 2015–16
| 21 || 20 || 28.2 || .444 || .395 || .81 || 3.1 || 2.0 || 1.1 || .3 || 10.3 || 11.0
|-
| style="text-align:left;"| 2016–17
| style="text-align:left;"| Bamberg
| 29 || 29 || 25.3 || .502 || .347 || .776 || 3.2 || 2.2 || .8 || .4 || 9.9 || 11.0
|-
| style="text-align:left;background:#AFE6BA;"| 2017–18†
| style="text-align:left;"rowspan=2| Real Madrid
| 36 || 24 || 18.1 || .529 || .441 || .712 || 1.6 || 1.9 || .4 || .1 || 6.9 || 7.2
|-
| style="text-align:left;"| 2018–19
| 35 || 24 || 14.1 || .476 || .415 || .703 || 1.7 || 1.4 || .3 || .0 || 5.8 || 5.5
|- class="sortbottom"
| colspan="2" style="text-align:center;"| Career
| 158 || 120 || 22.9 || .487 || .368 || .750 || 2.4 || 1.9 || .8 || .1 || 8.3 || 8.7

References

External links
 Fabien Causeur at acb.com 
 Fabien Causeur at draftexpress.com
 Fabien Causeur at eurobasket.com
 Fabien Causeur at euroleague.net
 Fabien Causeur at fiba.com (archive)
 

1987 births
Living people
2010 FIBA World Championship players
Basketball players at the 2012 Summer Olympics
Brose Bamberg players
Cholet Basket players
French expatriate basketball people in Spain
French men's basketball players
Liga ACB players
Olympic basketball players of France
Real Madrid Baloncesto players
Saski Baskonia players
Shooting guards
STB Le Havre players